All at No 20 is a British sitcom that aired on ITV from 10 February 1986 to 1 December 1987. Starring Maureen Lipman, it was written by Richard Ommanney, Ian Davidson, Peter Vincent and Alex Shearer. It was made for the ITV network by Thames Television and ran for two series. After the second series was slated by critics, a planned third series was cancelled.

Cast
Maureen Lipman – Sheila Haddon
Lisa Jacobs – Monica Haddon
Martin Clunes – Henry
Gary Waldhorn – Richard Beamish (series 1)
Gabrielle Glaister – Carol (series 1)
Gregory Doran – Chris Temple (series 1)
David Bannerman – Hamish McAlpine (series 1)
Carol Hawkins – Candy (series 2)
Desmond McNamara – Frankie Lomax (series 2)

Plot
Maureen Lipman played Sheila Haddon, whose husband had died 18 months before the start of the first series. He died without any insurance, so on top of her grief she has to pay off the mortgage of her house (No 20). To do this, rather than ask for help, she decides to take in young lodgers. Monica, her twenty-year-old student daughter, is asked to help. She brings back her fellow art student Carol, a doctor called Henry, as well as Chris, Hamish, Candy and Frankie. Sheila also gets many part-time jobs, while her old friend Richard Beamish proposes marriage to her.

Episodes

Series One (1986)

Series Two (1987)
1 "Now We Are Four" (27 October 1987)
Now down to just one lodger (Henry), Sheila must find another. Henry has a crush on Monica, much to her annoyance. To help, Sheila manages to talk him out of it, but Henry then falls for Sheila. Richard writes to say that he has proposed to another woman.
2 "Three in a Bed" (3 November 1987)
New lodger Candi moves in. Monica becomes jealous at the attention she gets from Sheila. In temper, Monica threatens to move out and to spend the night in a seedy bar. Sheila goes to rescue her but is arrested when the bar is raided by Police.
3 "My Kitten, Right Or Wrong" (10 November 1987)
Monica is depressed that none of her art college paintings have sold. Sheila secretly buys one, but Monica finds out and is furious. Meanwhile, a cat the housemates have adopted has kittens.
4 "Warts and All" (17 November 1987)
Sheila is dreading an old schoolmate visiting as she has always been made feel inferior to her. On the day after a lot of panic, her husband shows up to say that she can't make it due to a migraine, but he tells her that she has always been jealous of Sheila.
5 "The Tea Leaf" (24 November 1987)
In search of another lodger, Sheila decides to take in an ex-convict, Frankie. The others are not so happy about this, but soon warm to him.
6 "The Prowler" (1 December 1987)
Alerted by a prowler outside, Sheila calls the Police. The Officer takes a shine to her and they go out on a date. Sheila finds him boring and tries to avoid him, but to her relief he tells her his estranged wife has returned. The prowler turns out to be a stray fox.

DVD release
The Complete Series of All at No 20 was released by Network in the UK (Region 2) on 15 June 2015.

References

Mark Lewisohn, "Radio Times Guide to TV Comedy", BBC Worldwide Ltd, 2003
British TV Comedy Guide for All at No 20

External links

1986 British television series debuts
1987 British television series endings
1980s British sitcoms
ITV sitcoms
Television series by Fremantle (company)
Television shows set in London
English-language television shows
Television shows produced by Thames Television